Niue competed at the 2015 Pacific Games in Port Moresby, Papua New Guinea from 4 to 18 July 2015. Niue listed 22 competitors in 7 sports as of 4 July 2015.

Athletics

Niue qualified one athlete in athletics:

 Boston Vakaheketaha

Bodybuilding

Niue qualified two athletes in bodybuilding:

 Isabelle Davis
 Reagan Ioane

Golf

Niue qualified two athletes in golf:

 Ten Talagi
 Charlie Togahai

Lawn bowls

Niue qualified ten athletes in lawn bowls:

Men
 Mark Blumsky
 Dalton Tagelagi
 Keith Papani
 Frederick Tafatu
 Ezra Talamahina

Women
 Koumanogi Maota
 Catherine Papani
 Josephine Peyroux
 Pauline Rex Blumsky
 Fouasosa Tohovaka

Powerlifting

Niue qualified one athlete in powerlifting:

 Malia Vea

Shooting

Niue qualified four athletes in shooting:

 Morgan Magatogia
 Hivi Puheke
 Edward Sietu
 Sione Togiavalu

Weightlifting

Niue qualified three athletes in weightlifting:

 Moses Mautama
 Motoria Tano
 Malia Vea

References

Pacific Games
Nations at the 2015 Pacific Games
Niue at the Pacific Games